Diego Ferreyra  (born ) is a Chilean road and track cyclist. 

He won a bronze medal at the 2016 Pan American Track Cycling Championships in the team pursuit.

Major results
2015
 1st  Junior National Time Trial Championships
2016
 3rd Team pursuit, Pan American Track Championships
2017
 1st  Under–23 National Time Trial Championships
2018
 1st Time trial, Pan American Under–23 Road Championships
2019
 1st Time trial, Pan American Under–23 Road Championships

References

External links

1997 births
Living people
Chilean male cyclists
Chilean track cyclists
Place of birth missing (living people)
Cyclists at the 2019 Pan American Games
Pan American Games competitors for Chile
20th-century Chilean people
21st-century Chilean people